Malin Ulvefeldt (born 27 February 1994) is a Swedish tennis player.

Ulvefeldt has a career high WTA singles ranking of 587, achieved on 13 July 2015. She also has a career high WTA doubles ranking of 643 achieved on 4 November 2013. Ulvefeldt has won 1 ITF doubles title.

Ulvefeldt made her WTA main draw debut at the 2015 Swedish Open in the doubles event partnering Cornelia Lister.

ITF finals (1–4)

Singles (0–3)

Doubles (1–1)

External links
 
 

Swedish female tennis players
1994 births
Living people
20th-century Swedish women
21st-century Swedish women